Mikunigaoka Station may refer to:
 Mikunigaoka Station (Osaka) (三国ヶ丘駅), a train station in Sakai, Osaka, Japan
 Mikunigaoka Station (Fukuoka) (三国が丘駅), a train station in Ogōri, Fukuoka, Japan